A laugh is an expression of mirth particular to the human species.

Laugh may also refer to:

Laugh (Keller Williams album), a 2002 album by Keller Williams
Laugh (band), a precursor  of the band Intastella
Laugh Comics, a comic book produced by Archie Comics from 1946 to 1987
Laugh (Terry Hall album), a 1997 album by Terry Hall
"Laugh", a 1967 song off The Monkees album, More of the Monkees

See also
Last Laugh (disambiguation)